Camponotus planatus, known generally as the compact carpenter ant or short carpenter ant, is one of three Camponotus species that is polygynous (having more than one queen), it also is a species of ant in the family Formicidae.

Subspecies
 Camponotus planatus acaciae Emery, 1920
 Camponotus planatus colombicus Forel, 1899
 Camponotus planatus continentis Forel, 1901
 Camponotus planatus esdras Forel, 1916
 Camponotus planatus planatus Roger, 1863

References

 Hansson C, Lachaud J, Pérez-Lachaud G (2011). "Entedoninae wasps (Hymenoptera, Chalcidoidea, Eulophidae) associated with ants (Hymenoptera, Formicidae) in tropical America, with new species and notes on their biology". ZooKeys 134: 62–82.

Further reading

 Arnett, Ross H. (2000). American Insects: A Handbook of the Insects of America North of Mexico. CRC Press.

planatus
Insects described in 1863